Hellinsia acuminatus is a moth of the family Pterophoridae. It has been found in South Africa, Lesotho, and Malawi.

References

acuminatus
Moths of Africa
Lepidoptera of South Africa
Moths described in 1920